Animal lead poisoning (also known as avian plumbism, or avian saturnism for birds) is a veterinary condition and pathology caused by increased levels of the heavy metal lead in animal's body.

Lead interferes with a variety of body and natural processes.
It is toxic to many organs and tissues including the heart, bones, intestines, kidneys, and reproductive and nervous systems. It mainly affects the  haematopoietic system. It also affects the sulfhydryl group containing enzymes and also thiol content of erythrocyte. It inhibits the enzyme delta amino levaminic acid dehydrogenase enzyme (ALA) which is present in the red blood cell.
It is therefore particularly toxic to young animals, mainly dogs and cattle.

As in humans, animal lead poisoning may be acute  (from intense exposure of short duration) or chronic (from repeat low-level exposure over a prolonged period). Acute intoxication can quickly lead to death.

Prevalence 
Lead is now a common environmental pollutant. For the birds, a commons source is lead shot, eaten as grit.

Routes of exposure to lead poisoning 

Those routes include contaminated air, water, soil, and food, and also, for birds ingestion of grit (lead shots, lead bullets), ingestion of paints, materials that are left out from the factories like batteries etc.

Prevention 
The use of alternative metals in shot such as steel and tungsten have been implemented since 1991 in the United States for all migratory bird hunting. Some ammunition manufacturers are producing bullets made of solid copper or a mix of 95% copper 5% zinc, which are in ways superior to lead bullets. There have been efforts to dredge marshlands to remove the build-up of lead in the sediment from the past however efforts such as this are expensive.

Treatment 

For precious animals;
 Repeat screening, case management to abate sources
 Medical and environmental evaluation,
 veterinary evaluation, chelation, case management
 If necessary, veterinary hospitalization, immediate chelation, case management.

The mainstays of treatment are removal from the source of lead and, for precious animals who have significantly high blood lead levels or who have symptoms of poisoning, chelation therapy with a chelating agent.

Wildlife and lead poisoning 

Lead, one of the leading causes of toxicity in waterfowl, has been known to cause die-offs of wild bird populations. When hunters use lead shot, waterfowl such as ducks and other species (swan especially) can ingest the spent pellets later and be poisoned; predators that eat these birds are also at risk. Lead shot-related waterfowl poisonings were first documented in the US in the 1880s. By 1919, the spent lead pellets from waterfowl hunting was positively identified as the source of waterfowl deaths. Lead shot has been banned for hunting waterfowl in several countries, including the US in 1991 and 1997 in Canada. Other threats to wildlife include lead paint, sediment from lead mines and smelters, and lead weights from fishing lines. Lead in some fishing gear has been banned in several countries.

The critically endangered California condor has also been affected by lead poisoning. As scavengers, condors eat carcasses of game that have been shot but not retrieved, and with them the fragments from lead bullets; this increases their lead levels. Among condors around the Grand Canyon, lead poisoning due to eating lead shot is the most frequently diagnosed cause of death. In an effort to protect this species, in areas designated as the California condor's range the use of projectiles containing lead has been banned to hunt deer, wild pig, elk, pronghorn antelope, coyotes, ground squirrels, and other non-game wildlife. Also, conservation programs exist which routinely capture condors, check their blood lead levels, and treat cases of poisoning.

Farm animals 
Cows and horses as well as pet animals are also susceptible to the effects of lead toxicity. Sources of lead exposure in pets can be the same as those that present health threats to humans sharing the environment, such as paint and blinds, and there is sometimes lead in toys made for pets. Lead poisoning in a pet dog may indicate that children in the same household are at increased risk for elevated lead levels.

See also 
 Agreement on the Conservation of African-Eurasian Migratory Waterbirds
 Lead poisoning in raptors

References

Cited texts

External links 
 National Pollutant Inventory - Lead and Lead Compounds Fact Sheet

Animal
Intellectual disability